Ann Royer is a painter and sculptor living and working in Cedar Rapids, Iowa. Her work consists mostly of abstract nudes and horses. She was born in Sioux City, Iowa in 1933.

Education and work
Royer graduated from the School of Art at Colorado College. She later attended the University of Minnesota, Duluth. Royer studied art against her family's  initial wishes.

Ann credits a 1975 Chinese Art Exposition as her greatest source of inspiration. In 1966, Ann found herself as one of the first US civilians to set foot in the USSR as part of the Congress of Infectious Diseases.

In 2008, Ann Royer was the subject of a short documentary by writer/filmmaker Brett Edward Stout. The documentary was shown at the Cedar Rapids Independent Film Festival and on KCRG TV9.

Exhibitions 
Royer's work is prominently featured in the Cornerhouse Art Gallery. Between 1975 and 1997, her work was exhibited at the Sioux City Art Center, the Museum of Art Cedar Rapids, the Jewish Community Center Houston, Engel Gallery Jerusalem, the Zoma Gallery New York, the Ice House Dallas, and the Osburne Gallery in St. Paul, Minnesota.

Public Sculptures 

Royer was commissioned by the city to create several large bronze public sculptures in downtown Cedar Rapids, Iowa. Her large sculptures include “Pas De Deux” on the corner of 1st Avenue and 3rd Street, “Between Friends” on the corner of 3rd Avenue and 3rd Street, and a recently revealed sculpture at Mount Mercy College.

References 

Artists from Cedar Rapids, Iowa
Living people
1933 births
American women painters
Painters from Iowa
Sculptors from Iowa
21st-century American women artists
University of Minnesota Duluth alumni
Colorado College alumni